The Federal Office for Civil Aviation can refer to:
Federal Office for Civil Aviation of Germany
Federal Office of Civil Aviation, Switzerland